You Love Me is a thriller novel by Caroline Kepnes, published in April 2021. It is the sequel to her 2016 novel, Hidden Bodies, and third instalment of the You series.

The novel debuted at number fifteen on The New York Times fiction best-seller list for the week ending April 10, 2021.

Kepnes will publish another sequel, For You and You Only, in 2023.

Synopsis 
Following a major upheaval in his life, Joe Goldberg leaves Los Angeles for new pastures in the Pacific Northwest. When he meets the lovely Mary Kay DiMarco, Joe intensely falls for her. Ready to prove that he is a different man, Joe tries to court her without his usual obsessive acts. After securing a job in a new sleepy town and striving to prove an alternative method of making his next relationship work without meddling, he tries to find his happily ever after. But can Joe really prove that he is capable of change to find himself worthy of true love, or is he set to repeat history, dooming others to an ill-fated end of violence and destruction?

Reception 
Sarah Weinman from The New York Times gave a glowing review of the novel, stating that it "continues to work because Kepnes is brilliant at depicting the cognitive dissonance of someone like Joe. His stalkerish behavior steps over the line again and again, but in a way that is all too familiar to any woman menaced or made uncomfortable by the so-called “good guy." No doubt he'll return in future installments, demonstrating the shattered barrier between id and superego."

Sequels 
Kepnes will publish a third sequel, For You and Only You, in 2023.

References 

2021 American novels
American thriller novels
Novels set in Washington (state)
American satirical novels
Sequel novels
Novels by Caroline Kepnes
Random House books